The 1848 United States presidential election in Pennsylvania took place on November 7, 1848, as part of the 1848 United States presidential election. Voters chose 26 representatives, or electors to the Electoral College, who voted for President and Vice President.

Pennsylvania voted for the Whig candidate, Zachary Taylor, over the Democratic candidate, Lewis Cass. Taylor won Pennsylvania by a margin of 3.62%. Pennsylvania proved to be decisive as Cass would have won the Electoral College if he had carried Pennsylvania.

Results

See also
 List of United States presidential elections in Pennsylvania

References

Pennsylvania
1848
1848 Pennsylvania elections